Microcholus is a genus of flower weevils in the beetle family Curculionidae. There are at least four described species in Microcholus.

Species
These four species belong to the genus Microcholus:
 Microcholus erasus LeConte & J.L., 1880
 Microcholus laevicollis LeConte & J.L., 1876
 Microcholus puncticollis LeConte, 1876
 Microcholus striatus LeConte, 1876

References

Further reading

 
 
 

Baridinae
Articles created by Qbugbot